Phyllonorycter pulchra is a moth of the family Gracillariidae. It is known from the islands of Kyushu and Honshu in Japan and from Taiwan.

The wingspan is 6.5–7.5 mm.

The larvae feed as leaf miners on Rubus illecebrosus and Rubus palmatus var. coptophyllus. The larva mines into the inter-parenchyma of the leaves.

References

pulchra
Moths of Asia

Moths of Japan
Moths of Taiwan
Moths described in 1963
Taxa named by Tosio Kumata
Leaf miners